The Club Tijuana Xoloitzcuintles de Caliente Premier played in the Liga Premier in Tijuana, Baja California, Mexico and were the official reserve team for Club Tijuana. The games were held in the city of Tijuana in the CAR Tijuana.

Players

Current squad

References

Club Tijuana
Mexican reserve football clubs
Football clubs in Baja California
Liga Premier de México